The 2010 French Open Super Series was a top level badminton competition which was held from November 2, 2010 to November 7, 2010 in Paris, France. It was the tenth BWF Super Series competition on the 2010 BWF Super Series schedule. The total purse for the event was $200,000.

Men's singles

Top half

Bottom half

Final

Women's singles

Top half

Bottom half

Final

Men's doubles

Top half

Bottom half

Final

Women's doubles

Top half

Bottom half

Final

Mixed doubles

Top half

Bottom half

Final

References

External links
French Super Series 2010 at tournamentsoftware.com

2010 French Super Series
F
French